PRIMERGY is Fujitsu's brand name for x86-architecture designed servers. The brand name PRIMERGY represents a range of servers from single-socket over dual-socket to quad-socket systems. Eight socket systems are branded differently with "PRIMEQUEST," whereas Fujitsu servers in the UNIX/Mainframe world, also known as SPARC systems, are named "Fujitsu M10" and mainframes "BS2000."

History 

The brand PRIMERGY was initially used 1994 by Siemens Nixdorf Computers. Due to certain acquisitions and takeovers PRIMERGY survived the time of the joint-venture between Fujitsu and Siemens, namely, Fujitsu Siemens Computers until today.

Current portfolio 

Fujitsu Server PRIMERGY are available in different form factors and height units.

Naming scheme 

All PRIMERGY servers follow a dedicated naming scheme, as shown in the graphic below. First, it delivers information about the form factor of the system, secondly the number of sockets is given, thirdly, it incorporates the used processor family (currently only Intel processors), and then a number for the feature-set of the system and lastly, the appendix gives insight about the system generation according to the Intel Xeon processor family generation development.

TX - tower servers 

The abbreviation TX stands for tower servers. The current portfolio of PRIMERGY TX consists of the following:
 TX1310 M1
 TX1320 M2
 TX1330 M2
 TX150 S8 (old naming)
 TX2540 M1
 TX2560 M2

RX - rack servers 

The abbreviation RX stands for rack servers. The current portfolio of PRIMERGY RX consists of the following:
 RX1330 M2
 RX2510 M2
 RX2520 M1
 RX2530 M2
 RX2540 M2
 RX2560 M2
 RX4770 M2

BX - blade servers 

The abbreviation BX stands for blade servers. The current portfolio of PRIMERGY BX consists of the following:
 Blade Chassis
 BX400 S1
 BX600 S1
 BX600 S2
 BX600 S3
 BX900 S2
Server Blades
 BX2560 M2
 BX2580 M2
Storage Blades
 SX910 S1
 SX940 S1
 SX960 S1
 SX980 S2

CX - scale-out servers 

The abbreviation CX stands for scale-out or cloud Servers. The current portfolio of PRIMERGY CX consists of the following:

Chassis
 CX400 M1
 CX400 S2
 CX420 S1
Server Nodes
 CX2550 M2
 CX2570 M2
 CX250 S2
 CX270 S2
 CX272 S1

Family features 

Some features in PRIMERGY servers are available in all systems.

Cool-safe Advanced Thermal Design 

Cool-safe Advanced Thermal Design is Fujitsu's brand name for systems that can operate in higher ambient temperatures. The extended temperature range is from 5 °C to 40 °C, supposedly allowing to raising the temperature in a data center and thus saving on cooling costs.

ServerView Suite 
ServerView Suite is the administration software which is used to manage Fujitsu's PRIMERGY and PRIMEQUEST servers or to integrate these servers in enterprise management solutions like Microsoft System Center, VMware vSphere and Nagios Core. To monitor other vendors' systems in ServerView their Management Information Base (MIB) can be integrated.

PRIMEQUEST - differentiation 
PRIMEQUEST is the brand-name for business and mission-critical servers. FUJITSU Server PRIMEQUEST is also an x86 architecture designed server, but with extended RAS-features.

PRIMEFLEX 
FUJITSU Integrated System PRIMEFLEX is Fujitsu's brand name for solutions, addressing different markets, segments and customers. Many of the PRIMEFLEX solutions incorporate PRIMERGY server systems. PRIMEFLEX is a combination of hardware, software and service that are "pre-defined, pre-integrated and pre-tested".

See also 
 List of computer manufacturers
 List of Fujitsu products
 IPMI
 x86
 Server (Computing)
 Intel® Xeon® processor family

External links 
 FUJITSU Server PRIMERGY - Fujitsu CEMEA&I
 History of Fujitsu : Fujitsu Global
 http://www.computerwoche.de/a/die-geschichte-von-fujitsu,2489910  (German)
 White Paper: Integration of HP Servers into ServerView® Operations Manager

References

Fujitsu servers
X86-based computers